Balduina  (honeycombhead) is a genus of North American plants in the sunflower family described as a genus in 1818.

The genus is endemic to the Southeastern United States. It is named in honor of William Baldwyn M.D., 1779–1819, of Savannah, Georgia.

 Species
 Balduina angustifolia (Pursh) B.L.Rob. - Florida Georgia Alabama Mississippi
 Balduina atropurpurea R.M.Harper - Florida Georgia South Carolina North Carolina
 Balduina uniflora Nutt. - Louisiana Florida Georgia (U.S. state) Alabama Mississippi South Carolina North Carolina

References

Helenieae
Endemic flora of the United States
Flora of the Southeastern United States
Taxa named by Thomas Nuttall
Asteraceae genera